The Madagascar swamp warbler (Acrocephalus newtoni) is a species of Old World warbler in the family Acrocephalidae.
It is found only in Madagascar.
Its natural habitat is swamps.

References 

Madagascar swamp warbler
Endemic birds of Madagascar
Madagascar swamp warbler
Taxonomy articles created by Polbot